Nicolas Dumont (born 6 June 1940) is a Belgian water polo player. He competed at the 1960 Summer Olympics and the 1964 Summer Olympics.

References

External links
 

1940 births
Living people
Belgian male water polo players
Olympic water polo players of Belgium
Water polo players at the 1960 Summer Olympics
Water polo players at the 1964 Summer Olympics
Sportspeople from Brussels
20th-century Belgian people